IA2 or similar may refer to:
 Iowa Highway 2, a state highway which runs across southern Iowa
 Iowa's 2nd congressional district, a congressional district in the U.S. state of Iowa
 Italian Astronomical Archives Center, an archive of astronomical data
 IMBEL IA-2, a rifle design being evaluated by the Brazilian Army
 Islet antigen-2, a protein in the human pancreas